Paul Koebe (15 February 1882 – 6 August 1945) was a 20th-century German mathematician. His work dealt exclusively with the complex numbers, his most important results being on the uniformization of Riemann surfaces in a series of four papers in 1907–1909.  He did his thesis at Berlin, where he worked under Hermann Schwarz. He was an extraordinary professor at Leipzig from 1910 to 1914, then an ordinary professor at the University of Jena before returning to Leipzig in 1926 as an ordinary professor. He died in Leipzig.

He conjectured the Koebe quarter theorem on the radii of disks in the images of injective functions, in 1907. His conjecture became a theorem when it was proven by Ludwig Bieberbach in 1916, and the function  providing a tight example for this theorem became known as the Koebe function.

Awards
 1922, Ackermann–Teubner Memorial Award

See also
Koebe groups
Midsphere
Riemann mapping theorem

References

External links
 

1882 births
1945 deaths
People from Luckenwalde
20th-century German mathematicians
Academic staff of the University of Jena
Academic staff of Leipzig University
Humboldt University of Berlin alumni
People from the Province of Brandenburg